Gorrell Run is a stream in the U.S. state of West Virginia.

Gorrell Run was named in honor of a local pioneer.

See also
List of rivers of West Virginia

References

Rivers of Tyler County, West Virginia
Rivers of West Virginia